Rivetina asiatica is a species of praying mantis in the family Rivetinidae, native to western Asia.

The insect is endemic to Asian Turkey.

See also
List of mantis genera and species
Mantodea of Asia

References

A
Endemic fauna of Turkey
Mantodea of Asia
Insects of Turkey
Insects described in 1967